Nadushan District is in Meybod County, Yazd province, Iran. At the 2006 National Census, the region's population (as a part of Khezrabad District of Ashkezar County) was 3,399 in 1,010 households. The following census in 2011 counted 3,704 people in 1,168 households. At the latest census in 2016, there were 3,119 inhabitants in 1,027 households, by which time Nadushan Rural District and the city of Nadushan had been transferred to Meybod County as Nadushan District, and divided into two districts and the city.

References 

Meybod County

Districts of Yazd Province

Populated places in Yazd Province

Populated places in Meybod County

fa:بخش ندوشن